Talang 2017 was the seventh season of Talang, the Swedish version of Got Talent. Jury for this season are Alexander Bard, David Batra, Kakan Hermansson and LaGaylia Frazier. Presenters are Pär Lernström and Kristina "Keyyo" Petrushina. The season started airing on 18 March 2017 on TV4. The winner was Ibrahim Nasrullayeu, a 17 year old refugee singer from Azerbaijan.

References

Talang (Swedish TV series)
2017 Swedish television seasons